Tayla Lovemore (born 20 March 1995), is a South African  swimmer who specializes in women's butterfly events and freestyle relay. She competed in the women's 4 × 100 metre freestyle relay at the 2019 World Aquatics Championships.

References

1995 births
Living people
Place of birth missing (living people)
Universiade medalists in swimming
Universiade gold medalists for South Africa
Medalists at the 2019 Summer Universiade
South African female butterfly swimmers
South African female freestyle swimmers
21st-century South African women